Izaac Wang is an American actor best known for his work on Good Boys (2019) and Raya and the Last Dragon (2021).

Career
After appearing in the TV Land series Teachers, Wang landed his first film role as Soren in the 2019 Universal Pictures film Good Boys. In June 2019, he was cast as Owen Yu in the Paramount Pictures film Clifford the Big Red Dog. In June 2020, he appeared in the Lionsgate film Think Like a Dog. In March 2021, he gained notability when he portrayed Boun in the Walt Disney Pictures animated film Raya and the Last Dragon (2021). In February 2021, Wang was cast as Sam Wing in the HBO Max streaming series Gremlins: Secrets of the Mogwai (2023).

Personal life
Wang was born to a Chinese father and Laotian mother.

Filmography

Film

Television

References

External links
 

21st-century American actors
Actors from Minnesota
American male film actors
American male child actors
American people of Chinese descent
American people of Laotian descent
American television actors
American male voice actors
Living people
People from Minnesota
Year of birth missing (living people)